CloudWalk Technology Co. Ltd. is a Chinese developer of facial recognition software.

The company has been sanctioned by the United States government for allegedly participating in major human rights abuses against Uyghurs.

History
CloudWalk was founded by Zhou Xi, a graduate of the University of Science and Technology of China with an academic background in artificial intelligence and pattern recognition. CloudWalk was founded in April 2015, following Zhou's departure from the Chinese Academy of Sciences.

In 2017, CloudWalk raised $379 million in Series B funding from investors including Shunwei Capital, Oriza Holdings, and Puhua Capital.

Role in mass surveillance of the Uyghurs

On May 22, 2020, the United States Department of Commerce added CloudWalk Technology to its Entity List for its role in aiding the Chinese government in the mass surveillance of the Uyghur population. CloudWalk Technology partnered with the University of Illinois at Urbana–Champaign to develop the surveillance technology. According to U.S. officials, CloudWalk Technology was, "complicit in human rights violations and abuses committed in China’s campaign of repression, mass arbitrary detention, forced labor and high-technology surveillance against Uighurs, ethnic Kazakhs, and other members of Muslim minority groups in the Xinjiang Uighur Autonomous Region (XUAR)". In December 2021, the United States Department of the Treasury prohibited all U.S. investment in Cloudwalk Technology, accusing the company of complicity in aiding the Uyghur genocide.

In October 2022, the United States Department of Defense added CloudWalk to a list of "Chinese military companies" operating in the U.S.

Customers

CloudWalk is the primary supplier of facial recognition technology to the Bank of China and Haitong Securities.

In 2018, CloudWalk signed a deal to provide the government of Zimbabwe with a mass facial recognition system, which will monitor all major transportation hubs, as well as create a national facial ID database.

References

Software companies of China
2015 establishments in China
Facial recognition software
Chinese brands
Defence companies of China